Moon mist is an ice cream flavour popular in the Atlantic Canadian provinces of Nova Scotia, Prince Edward Island, and New Brunswick, as well as Newfoundland and Labrador. Believed to have been created in Nova Scotia in the 1960s, the ice cream is a combination of banana, grape and bubble gum flavours and is sold by many of the large regional dairy producers. These flavours are not fully blended together. For some local ice cream parlors, moon mist is amongst the most popular flavours sold.

Cultural significance 
In 2020, during the COVID-19 pandemic in Nova Scotia, ReTales, a website dedicated to tracking retail and restaurant businesses in the Halifax Regional Municipality, began selling Melissa Buote-designed moon mist-themed merchandise amongst other products as a way to raise funds for local non-profit organizations.

Farmers Moon Mist 
One of the biggest brands in the region that sells moon mist is Farmers, which is owned by the Quebec-based Agropur Dairy Cooperative. The Moon Mist product was obtained by Agropur after they purchased Nova Scotia-based dairy producer Scotsburn in January 2017.

See also 
 Spumoni

References 

Canadian cuisine
Desserts
Cuisine of Nova Scotia